Dorota is a Polish, Czech and Slovak female given name, cognate with Dorothy.

Notable people with the name include:
Dorota Andraka (born 1961), Polish-American educator
Dorota Dabrowska, Polish statistician
Dorota Gawron (born 1983), represented Poland in the Miss Universe pageant
Dorota Gruca (born 1970), Polish marathon runner
Dorota Barbara Jabłonowska (1760–1844), Polish noblewoman
Dorota Jakuta (born 1958), Polish politician
Dorota Jędrusińska (born 1982), Polish track and field sprint athlete
Dorota Kędzierzawska (born 1957), Polish director of feature and documentary films
Dorota Kwaśna (born 1972), Polish cross country skier
Dorota Masłowska (born 1983), Polish writer and journalist
Dorota Nieznalska (born 1973), controversial Polish artist
Dorota Rabczewska (born 1984), Polish singer
Dorota Siudek (born 1975), Polish retired pairs skater who is now a coach
Dorota Świeniewicz (born 1972), Polish volleyball player
Dorota Sitańska (born 1767), Polish ballerina
Dorota Tarnowska (1513–1540), Polish noblewoman
Dorota Terakowska (1938–2004), Polish novelist and journalist

See also
Dorothy (given name)
Dorothea (disambiguation)

Feminine given names